Nationality words link to articles with information on the nation's poetry or literature (for instance, Irish or France).

Events

Works published in English

United Kingdom
 John Codrington Bampfylde, Sixteen Sonnets
 William Combe, The Auction
 George Ellis, writing under the pen name "Sir Gregory Gander", Poetical Tales
 William Hayley, A Poetical Epistle to an Eminent Painter, published anonymously; addressed to George Romney
 Vicesimus Knox, Cursory Thoughts on Satire and Satirists, a critical essay
 John Scott, Moral Eclogues, published anonymously
 Percival Stockdale, Inquiry into the Nature and Genuine Laws of Poetry; including a particular Defence of the Writings and Genius of Mr. Pope
 John Wolcot, writing under the pen name "Peter Pindar", A Poetical, Supplicating, Modest and Affecting Epistle to those Literary Colossuses the Reviewers

United States
 Joel Barlow, The Prospect of Peace
 William Billings, Chester
 Francis Hopkinson:
 "The Battle of the Kegs", United States
 "Date Obolum Bellisario"
 "The Birds, the Beasts, and the Bat"

Works published in other languages
 Ippolit Bogdanovich, Dushenka, a long poem and his best-known work, Russia
 Johannes Ewald, Kong Christian stod ved höjen Mast ("King Christian Stood by the Lofty mast"), a popular song in his melodrama The Fishermen, which later became the Danish national anthem (Henry Wadsworth Longfellow later translated it into English)
 Johann Gottfried Herder - Volkslieder nebst untermischten anderen Stücken
 Évariste de Parny - Les Poésies érotiques

Births
Death years link to the corresponding "[year] in poetry" article:
 February 6 – Ugo Foscolo (died 1827), Italian writer, revolutionary and poet
 April 10 – William Hazlitt (died 1830), English writer, essayist and critic
 August 22 – James Kirke Paulding (died 1860), American novelist, poet and United States Secretary of the Navy; a writer for Salamagundi magazine who took it over before it failed
 September 9 – Clemens Brentano (died 1842), German poet and novelist
 December 22 – Anna Maria Porter (died 1832), English poet and novelist
 Robert Davidson (died 1855), Scottish peasant poet

Deaths
Birth years link to the corresponding "[year] in poetry" article:
 May 30 – Voltaire (born 1694), French Enlightenment writer, poet, essayist and philosopher
 August 11 – Augustus Toplady (born 1740), English Anglican clergyman, poet and hymn-writer
 Rob Donn (born 1714), Scottish Gaelic poet

See also

 18th century in literature
 18th century in poetry
 French literature of the 18th century
 List of years in poetry
 List of years in literature
 Sturm und Drang (the conventional translation is "Storm and Stress"; a more literal translation, however, might be "storm and urge", "storm and longing", "storm and drive" or "storm and impulse"), a movement in German literature (including poetry) and music from the late 1760s through the early 1780s

Notes

18th-century poetry
Poetry